Bartosz Nowak (born 25 August 1993) is a Polish professional footballer who plays as a midfielder for Raków Częstochowa. Previously, he played for clubs such as Ruch Chorzów, Stal Mielec and Górnik Zabrze.

Honours
Individual
Ekstraklasa Player of the Month: September 2020, August 2022

References

External links

Living people
1993 births
People from Radom
Association football midfielders
Polish footballers
Ekstraklasa players
I liga players
II liga players
Polonia Bytom players
Miedź Legnica players
Stal Mielec players
Ruch Chorzów players
Górnik Zabrze players
Raków Częstochowa players